Monarch Skyline Hotel is a hotel located in Nankan New Town, Luzhu District, Taoyuan City, Taiwan.

Restaurants and Bars
Wing Japanese Kitchen: A Japanese restaurant offering sushi and other classic Japanese delicacies.
Jiang-Zhe Kitchen: A Chinese restaurant located on the 3rd floor serving traditional Zhejiang cuisine and other Chinese delicacies.
Sky Bar: Bar located on the ground floor serving coffee, juices, cocktails, and spirits.

Transportation

See also
Novotel Taipei Taoyuan International Airport
Sheraton Taoyuan Hotel

References

External links
 Monarch Skyline Hotel official site

Hotel buildings completed in 2008
2008 establishments in Taiwan
Hotels established in 2008
Hotels in Taoyuan